Paul Starbuck (born 16 April 1967) is a former Australian rules footballer who played with the Sydney Swans in the Australian Football League (AFL).

Starbuck played many reserves matches for Carlton, including a premiership in 1987, before getting his chance to play senior football. When he finally made his league debut he was at a new club, Sydney, having been selected in the 1989 VFL Draft. His appearance against Fitzroy in the 12th round of the 1990 AFL season was his only AFL game. He had 11 disposals.

References

1967 births
Australian rules footballers from Victoria (Australia)
Sydney Swans players
Castlemaine Football Club players
Living people